Jariyeh may refer to:
 Jariyeh-e Seyyed Mohammad
 Jariyeh-ye Seyyed Musa